WQVR (940 AM) is a radio station broadcasting a classic hits format. Licensed to Webster, Massachusetts, United States, the station serves the Worcester area. The station is owned by Kurt Jackson, through licensee Quinebaug Valley Broadcasting, LLC. Its programming is also heard on translator station W257EH (99.3 FM). 

WQVR serves Southern Worcester County, Northern Rhode Island and Northeastern Connecticut. WQVR also provides the area with local high school sports coverage.

History

Lakeview Broadcasting Company was granted a construction permit for a new station on 940kHz in Webster, Massachusetts, on March 5, 1979; two months later, on May 7, the call sign WGFP was issued. The call sign stood for Gilbert Francis Perry, a relative of the original owner.

For several years now, WGFP had been operating from a long wire antenna instead of a tower. On the site of the tower rests an experimental tower, WX1CFA, using a "crossed field" design.

On December 29, 2017, WGFP changed formats to classic hits as “The Lake 940”. The station previously broadcast a country format as "Cool Country 940".

Just Because, Inc. sold WGFP to Quinebaug Valley Broadcasting for $75,000 effective September 29, 2022; principal Kurt Jackson is a part-owner of WARE in nearby Ware. On October 5, 2022, the new owners applied to change the call sign to WQVR, effective October 11.

References

External links

QVR
Classic hits radio stations in the United States
Mass media in Worcester County, Massachusetts
Radio stations established in 1983
1983 establishments in Massachusetts